Garrie Clifford Cooper (22 December 1935 - 25 April 1982) was the founder of the highly successful Elfin Sports Cars and a competitive racing driver in his own right, winning the 1968 Singapore Grand Prix, the 1968 Australian 1½ Litre Championship, and the 1975 Australian Sports Car Championship - all in Elfin cars of his own design.

Elfin Sports Cars
Cooper established Elfin Sports Cars in 1959 with the help of his father Cliff Cooper. The first Elfin, the Steamliner, was a front-engined sports car. The prototype was completed in October 1959 and was followed by 22 production versions, the last of which was delivered in 1963. 

248 Elfins of various models had been completed by 1983.

Racing career
During the 1978 Australian Grand Prix at the fast Sandown Raceway in Melbourne, he suffered a broken leg in a high-speed crash while driving his own Elfin MR8 Formula 5000. Cooper's explanation for the high speed crash was that something broke on the car which sent him spearing into the fence.

In 1980, Cooper designed and built the first open wheel car in Australia to use ground effect aerodynamics, the Elfin MR9 (the MR9 remains the only F5000 ever constructed using ground effect). This car made its race début in Cooper's hands at the 1980 Australian Grand Prix at Melbourne's Calder Park Raceway. Originally to be driven by French Formula One driver Didier Pironi who had experience driving ground effects F1 cars, Cooper himself decided to drive the car as it had only been completed before practice and did not set a qualifying time. Pironi and Cooper's Ansett Team Elfin teammate John Bowe each drove an Elfin MR8 in the race, with Pironi finishing in third place, four laps down on the Williams FW07B Formula One car of  World Champion Alan Jones.

John Bowe also drove the MR9 on limited occasions and felt that with the ground effects it had a lot of potential. However, Elfin were finding out what others had found with ground effect in that it required stronger suspension components to cope with the higher downforce generated in the corners compared to the conventional F5000's with Bowe reportedly receiving a fright during a race at Sandown in 1981 when the front suspension broke on the car. Unfortunately the true potential of the Chevrolet V8 powered MR9 was never reached and its racing life was limited to just one year as F5000 racing was phased out of Australian motorsport at the end of 1981.

After limited appearances following the 1980 Australian Grand Prix, Cooper retired from racing following the 1981 season.

Health issues
Several years before, Cooper was admitted to hospital to have an artificial heart valve implanted. Due to the metallic material of the valve, Cooper had to take anti-coagulants, which caused concern from CAMS (the Confederation of Australian Motor Sport, Australia's motorsport ruling body), but after extensive lobbying from Cooper and countless letters supporting Cooper from his heart specialist, he was able to regain his racing license and continued his racing career.

Death
Early on Anzac Day (25 April) 1982, while working on a customer's car, Cooper died due to a ruptured aortic aneurysm.

Ansett Team Elfin drivers
Drivers who raced Elfin cars as teammate to Cooper include John McCormack, Vern Schuppan, John Bowe, Larry Perkins,  Formula One World Champion James Hunt, and Didier Pironi.

Career results

References
Motor Racing The Australian Way, Lansdowne Press, 1974, 

1935 births
1982 deaths
Racing drivers from South Australia
Tasman Series drivers